Indian War Whoop is the third studio album by the psychedelic folk duo the Holy Modal Rounders, released in 1967 through ESP-Disk.

Side one deals with psychedelic guitar and fiddle jams to radically altered interpretations of traditional folk songs. Side two is less experimental, as it focuses on retaining the freak-out style of their past albums. Michael Hurley contributes songs for the album, and would later be an official member of the band.

Track listing

Personnel 
The Holy Modal Rounders
Peter Stampfel – fiddle, banjo, electric fiddle, violin, vocals
Steve Weber – guitar, vocals

Additional musicians and production
Dick Alderham – engineering
Antonia, Barbara & Wendy – vocals
Miles Bachman – design
Howard "Howie" Bernstein – illustration
Ken Crabtree – keyboards
Lee Crabtree – piano, organ
David Gahr – photography
Dr. Jackson Illusion – production
Michael Sanzone – design
Sam Shepard – drums

References

External links 
 

1967 albums
ESP-Disk albums
The Holy Modal Rounders albums
Don Giovanni Records albums